Ballydargan is a townland eight kilometres south of Downpatrick, County Down, Northern Ireland. Ballydargan is in the parish of Bright.

Townlands of County Down
Civil parish of Bright